The Oxford Handbook of Clinical Medicine is a pocket textbook aimed at medical students and junior doctors, and covers all aspects of clinical medicine. It is published by Oxford University Press, and is available in print format and online. First published in 1985, it is now in its tenth edition, which was released in July 2017.

Description
The Oxford Handbook of Clinical Medicine, now in its 10th edition (July 2017), is a pocket textbook. It was first written by a group of friends as a collection of notes designed to help new doctors and covers the full breadth of the medical and surgery subjects. Popularly known in the UK as the "Cheese and Onion" owing to the colour scheme of the cover. It gives advice on clinical management issues, and includes "witty, esoteric asides" linking medicine to other areas, such as classic history and popular culture.  The OHCM, as it's also called, was banned from various UK medical schools for making medicine “too easy”, but by 2003 had made it onto several reading lists, including Royal Free London, with the comment “everybody owns this!!”

Editorial Team

The current edition of the Oxford Handbook of Clinical Medicine is edited by:

 Ian B. Wilkinson, Professor of Therapeutics, University of Cambridge, and Honorary Consultant Physician, Cambridge University Hospitals NHS Foundation Trust, UK
 Tim Raine, Clinical Fellow and Honorary Registrar, Gastroenterology and General Medicine, Wellcome Trust and Addenbrooke's Hospital, Cambridge, UK
 Kate Wiles, NIHR Doctoral Research Fellow in Nephrology and Obstetric Medicine, Guy's and St. Thomas' NHS Foundation Trust, London, UK
 Anna Goodhart, CMT, Manchester, UK
 Catriona Hall, GP Trainee, London, UK
 Harriet O'Neill, Dermatology Teaching Fellow, Derby, UK

Contents
Thinking about medicine
History and examination
Cardiovascular medicine
Chest medicine
Endocrinology
Gastroenterology
Renal medicine
Haematology
Infectious diseases
Neurology
Oncology and palliative care
Rheumatology
Surgery
Clinical chemistry
Eponymous syndromes
Radiology
Reference intervals, etc.
Practical procedures
Emergencies
References

References

Clinical Medicine
Medical manuals
1985 non-fiction books